Alenquer may refer to:

 Alenquer, Portugal, municipality
 Alenquer (Santo Estêvão e Triana), a civil parish within Alenquer, Portugal
 Alenquer, Pará, a municipality in the Brazilian state of Pará
 Alenquer DOC, a Portuguese wine region
 Alenquer (horse), Thoroughbred racehorse